Hober Gabriel Leyes Viera (born 29 May 1990) is a Uruguayan footballer who plays as a forward for Academia Cantolao in the Primera División Peruana.

Club career
Leyes started playing football at the age of 4 in Paysandú. He played until he was 12, starting in Independencia and later Litoral. Leyes then quit football at the age of 12, because he wasn’t playing, which he wasn’t used to. So he decided to quit.

He returned to play at the age of 14, joining Juventud Unida. In 2006, he went to Liverpool Montevideo, where he played for the clubs U16s and in the following year, he made the preseason with the clubs first team, but was released shortly after.

After being released, Leyes again wanted to quit playing. However, he returned to Juventud Unida where he soon after, got his debut for the clubs senior team at the age of 17.

In 2007, Leyes returned to Montevideo, joining Juventud who at the time, was playing in the First Division of Uruguayan football. The club later got into financial difficulties and Leyes decided to terminate his contract, as the club hadn't paid him his salary.

Leyes then returned to Paysandú and was training by him self for six months, before he suddenly got a trial invitation from River Plate, where he played a friendly game for the club against Defensor Sporting and scored. He then signed a four-year deal with the club.

In 2023, Leyes signed for Peruvian club Academia Cantolao.

Personal life
Leyes' first name, Hober, was given to him by his parents in honor of Peñarol legend Juan Hohberg.

References

External links
Profile at ESPN FC

1990 births
Living people
Uruguayan expatriate footballers
Uruguayan footballers
Association football forwards
Footballers from Paysandú
Club Atlético River Plate (Montevideo) players
Peñarol players
Juventud de Las Piedras players
Plaza Colonia players
Liverpool F.C. (Montevideo) players
Club Alianza Lima footballers
Cerro Largo F.C. players
Academia Deportiva Cantolao players
Uruguayan Primera División players
Peruvian Primera División players
Expatriate footballers in Peru
Uruguayan expatriate sportspeople in Peru